The variegated skink  (Trachylepis variegata) is a species of skink found in Africa.

References

Trachylepis
Reptiles described in 1870
Taxa named by Wilhelm Peters